Nduku Kilonzo is the executive director of the National Aids Control Council (NACC) of Kenya.

Background
During the 1990s, while working as a teacher in rural Kenya, she became aware of the gender disparities facing her female students. As time passed, Nduku focused on the relationship between gender-based violence and the spread of HIV. Later, she studied at the Liverpool School of Tropical Medicine, graduating with a PhD in Tropical Medicine, Gender and Health.

Career 
In 2012, she became manager of the Kenyan non-profit organization, LVCT, a Kenyan NGO focusing on reducing the transmission of HIV/AIDS. In May 2014, she was appointed to her present position of executive director of the National Aids Control Council (NACC) of Kenya.

She is also an Advisor in Gender and Rights Advocacy Panel to the World Health Organization. She serves as an editor of Reproductive Health Matters, a peer review journal and is a member of the Public Health Association of Kenya.  She is a Commissioner with the Lancet Commission for Health in Sub-Saharan Africa.

References

External links
Website of National Aids Control Council of Kenya

1970s births
Living people
Moi University alumni
Alumni of the University of Liverpool
Kamba people
Kenyan educators
21st-century Kenyan businesswomen
21st-century Kenyan businesspeople